Harpalus parasinuatus is a species of ground beetle in the subfamily Harpalinae. It was described by Kataev & Liang in 2007.

References

parasinuatus
Beetles described in 2007